The House of Spinola, or Spinola family, was a leading Italian political family centered in the Republic of Genoa. Their influence was at its greatest extent in the thirteenth and fourteenth centuries.

Important members 
Guido Spinola was one of the first important members of the family.  He served as Consul of Genoa in 1102. The family, which founded its wealth on trading, finance and the acquisition of land, originates from Guido and Oberto, grandsons of Belo Bozumi.

The next Spinola to come to prominence after Guido was Oberto. In May 1262 he joined forces with Oberto Doria to drive the foreign capitano del popolo of Genoa, Guglielmo Boccanegra, from power and reform the government.  They replaced him with two captains of the people, elected for 22 years, under Oberto Spinola and Oberto Doria. How long Oberto Spinola remained as Captain of the people is not clear. However, his son Corrado Spinola was a leading admiral in the Genoese war with Pisa. In 1266 Oberto lead the Genoese fleets in a victory against the Venetians. Then in 1270, they exiled the Fieschi and Grimaldi families. 

In about 1289 Corrado Spinola became the captain of the people in place of his father Oberto.  In 1301 Corrado Spinola resigned the office of Captain of the people, as did Lamba Doria.

The next phase of Spinola involvement was done by Opicino Spinola.

Galeotto Spinola was appointed Captain of the people in 1335 along with Raffaele Doria.  They overthrew the power of Robert of Naples in Genoa.

In 1435, Francesco Spinola was successful at the Siege of Gaeta in the war over the control of Naples.  Shortly afterwards, Francesco led a revolt that ended the rule of a Visconti based in Milan over Genoa.

The great Italian-Spanish general, Ambrogio Spinola, Captain-General of the Army of Flanders from 1603 to 1629 is a member of this family.

Doges of the Republic of Genoa 

 Battista Spinola, 47th doge.
 Luca Spinola, 57th doge.
 Simone Spinola, 66th doge.
 Tomaso Spinola, 90th doge
 Andrea Spinola, 99th doge.
 Alessandro Spinola, 112th doge.
 Agostino Spinola,  125th doge.
 Luca Spinola, 129th doge.
 Domenico Maria Spinola, 151st doge.
 Nicolò Spinola, 155th doge.
 Ferdinando Spinola,  172nd doge.

Sources 
 Malleson, George Bruce.  Studies in Genoese History. p. 294ff

References

Families of Genoa
Italian noble families
 
Political families of Italy
Republic of Genoa families